Roberto is a Spanish, Portuguese and Italian given name which originated from old Germanic Robert. Its related female name is Roberta.

Notable people with the name include:

Saint 
Roberto Bellarmino (1542–1621), Catholic bishop

Sportsmen 
 Robertino Pietri, Venezuelan motorcyclist
 Roberto Abbondanzieri, Argentinian footballer
 Roberto Acuña, Paraguayan footballer
 Roberto Alomar, Puerto Rican baseball player
 Roberto Amadio, Italian cyclist
 Roberto Ayala, Argentinian footballer
 Roberto Badiani, Italian footballer
 Roberto Baggio, Italian footballer
 Roberto Ballini, Italian footballer
 Roberto Baronio, Italian footballer
 Roberto Bettega, Italian footballer
 Roberto Boninsegna, Italian footballer
 Roberto Brunamonti, Italian basketballer
 Roberto Cammarelle, Italian boxer
 Roberto Carlos da Silva, Brazilian footballer
 Roberto Chiacig, Italian basketballer
 Roberto Chiappa, Italian cyclist
 Roberto Clemente, Puerto Rican baseball player
 Roberto Cravero, Italian footballer
 Roberto De Vicenzo, Argentinian golfer
 Roberto De Zerbi, Italian footballer
 Roberto Di Donna, Italian Olympic pistol shooter
 Roberto Donadoni, Italian coach and footballer
 Roberto Durán, Panamanian boxer
 Roberto Emílio da Cunha, Brazilian footballer
 Roberto Erlacher, Italian skier
 Roberto Galia, Italian coach and footballer
 Roberto Heras, Spanish cyclist
 Roberto Lerici, Italian coach and footballer
 Roberto Locatelli, Italian motorcyclist
 Roberto Maltagliati, Italian footballer
 Roberto Mancini, Italian footballer
 Roberto Mussi, Italian footballer
 Roberto Muzzi, Italian footballer
 Roberto Petagine, Venezuelan footballer
 Roberto Policano, Italian footballer
 Roberto Pruzzo, Italian footballer
 Roberto Rolfo, Italian motorcyclist
 Roberto Rosetti, Italian football referee
 Roberto Rojas, Chilean footballer
 Roberto Sosa, Argentinian footballer
Roberto Strauss (born 1952), Mexican swimmer
 Roberto Visentini, Italian cyclist

Other professions
Roberto Alagna, French operatic tenor
Roberto Bolle, Italian ballet dancer

Italian masculine given names
Portuguese masculine given names
Spanish masculine given names